Caperdonich distillery was a producer of Speyside single malt Scotch whisky that operated between 1898 and 1902, and then again between 1965 and 2002. Caperdonich whisky was a component of some blends of Chivas Regal.

History
Caperdonich, originally known as "Glen Grant #2", was built in 1898 by the founders of the Glen Grant distillery, J. & J. Grant. Glen Grant #2 closed after four years, and was dormant until 1965, when it was rebuilt by Glenlivet Distilleries Ltd. By that time, British law prohibited simultaneously operating distilleries from using the same name, and Glen Grant #2 was reopened as "Caperdonich". In 1967, two steam-heated pot stills were added. Technological advances allowed the distillery to be run by only two people.

The distillery was sold to Seagram in 1977, and sold again to Pernod Ricard in 2001. One year after purchasing Caperdonich, Pernod Ricard closed the distillery. In autumn 2010 the distillery was demolished.

References

External links
Scotch Whisky
Whisky Distilleries
Malt Madness 

1898 establishments in Scotland
2002 disestablishments in Scotland
Companies based in Moray
Scottish malt whisky
Distilleries in Scotland
British companies disestablished in 2002
British companies established in 1898
Demolished buildings and structures in Scotland
Buildings and structures demolished in 2010